High-technology swimwear, or tech suits, are scientifically advanced materials used for swimwear in competitive water sports such as swimming and triathlon. Materials of this type are normally spandex and nylon composite fabrics with features to reduce drag against the water. The fabrics include features that increase the swimmer's glide through water and reduce the absorption of water by the suit as opposed to regular swimsuits.

Purpose and design 
High-technology swimwear is designed to reduce drag and improve swimming performance. Speedo claims that their LZR Racer reduced drag or water resistance by 38% compared to a traditional Lycra practice swim suit. This high-technology swimwear is designed to minimize drag while maximizing support to muscles. Some companies claim that their fabrics reduce drag even more than the water's normal friction against the skin. To do this, they design high-end lines of competitive swimwear that cover the arms and legs. The fabric used for high-technology swimwear is light and water-repellent. The material is often composed of highly stretchy spandex and nylon. High-technology swimwear is often made using bonded seams, to reduce further drag. These suits also provide the compression necessary to increase performance.

Regulation 
After the 2008 Olympic Games, the International Swimming Federation (FINA) voted to regulate the use of high-technology swimwear in competition. More than 130 swimming world records were broken from 2008 through 2009 through the use of high-tech swimwear. However, FINA unanimously voted to regulate the use of these suits in official competition beginning in 2010. The banned suits used in 2008 and 2009 were polyurethane based. Guidelines as of 2015 have specific measures to regulate the thickness, buoyancy, and permeability of the fabric. The high-technology suits used in competition are no longer able to have zippers or other types of fastening. A large change found in the FINA regulations is the regulations in the design of the suit. Unlike the body suits seen in the 2008 Olympics, men's suits cannot extend above the navel or below the knee. Women's suits cannot cover the neck or extend past the shoulders, or below the knee.

Manufacturers 
High-tech fabric lines by swimwear manufacturers:
 A3 Performance – Stealth, Legend, and VICI
 Speedo – Aquablade, Fastskin, Fastskin 3, LZR Racer, LZR Elite, and LZR X
 Nike – LiftSuit and NG-1
 Arena – Powerskin ST, Powerskin XP and Powerskin R-EVO, Arena X-Glide, and Carbon Ultra
 Adidas – JetConcept, Hydrofoil, and Adizero
 TYR – Venzo, Avictor, Fusion, Aquapel, Aquashift, Tracer, AP12, and Avictor
 Zone Swimwear
 Dolfin – Titanium, LightStrike
 blueseventy  –  NeroTX and neroFIT
MP Michael Phelps - Xpresso
 Mizuno – GX Sonic
 Finis - Vapor, Rival

Controversy

Advantages 

Whether high-tech fabric lines such as these give substantial advantages to swimmers is debated. High-technology suits can increase one's swimming speed by around 4 percent. A 2012 study, by Joel Stager of Indiana University's Counsilman Center for the Science of Swimming, reportedly found an increase of only 0.34%. Most of the manufacturers counter with their own studies though touting the advantages of their own individual lines overall and against their competitors. Different manufacturers also offer specific advantages to particular types of swimmers—for example, the LZR X is popular among freestyle sprinters for its compression, while many distance swimmers find the compression detrimental to leg muscles over the course of a longer race.  Meanwhile, Arena suits are often preferred by breaststrokers for a looser fit, enabling better range of motion while performing a breaststroke kick.

Cost 

The materials are sometimes very expensive (USD$300–$600 or GBP£300-£500 for a full suit), limiting their use to highly competitive and professional levels of the sport. However, in recent years with the advance of technology the most basic 'high-technology swimwear' can be purchased for approximately $100 or £100.

Records 

Prior to the start of the ban of the high-tech swimsuits at the start of 2010, estimated that over 130 world records had already been broken using the high-tech fabrics. Nearly every medal winner at the 2008 Summer Olympics made use of the high-tech swimwear. This is often seen as the catalyst behind the "technological arms race" in professional swimming competitions including the 2009 World Championships. World Champion American swimmer Aaron Peirsol, who swam two world record times at the 2009 World Championships, said, "A lot of us are joking that this might be the fastest we ever go, we might as well enjoy this (2009) year". Many thought the introduced regulations on high-technology swimwear would end the era of record-breaking performances in swimming, and existing world records currently beaten with the high-tech swimwear be annotated with an asterisk. Nearly two and a half years after FINA regulations were in place 9 records were broken at the 2012 Olympics.

References

Swimsuits
Swimming controversies